Leptophlebia nebulosa is a species of pronggilled mayfly in the family Leptophlebiidae. It is found in North America.

References

Mayflies
Articles created by Qbugbot
Insects described in 1853